JWH-424 is a drug from the naphthoylindole family, which acts as a cannabinoid agonist at both the CB1 and CB2 receptors, but with moderate selectivity for CB2, having a Ki of 5.44nM at CB2 vs 20.9 nM at CB1. The heavier 8-iodo analogue is even more CB2 selective, with its 2-methyl derivative having 40 times selectivity for CB2. However the 1-propyl homologues in this series showed much lower affinity at both receptors, reflecting a generally reduced affinity for the 8-substituted naphthoylindoles overall.

In the United States, all CB1 receptor agonists of the 3-(1-naphthoyl)indole class such as JWH-424 are Schedule I Controlled Substances.

See also
 JWH-018
 JWH-398

References

Naphthoylindoles
JWH cannabinoids
Bromoarenes
Designer drugs
CB1 receptor agonists